Harraiya is a town and tehsil in Basti district in the Indian state of Uttar Pradesh.

History
In the Indian Rebellion of 1857, about 250 martyrs of Amorha State of Harraiya Tehsil were hanged by the British Government from peepal trees located at Chhawani.

It was then called Harirahiya in Awadhi which later turned into Harraiya.

Geography

Demographics
, Nagar Panchayat has total population of 9,158 of which 4,817 are males while 4,341 are females.

Politics
Harraiya (Assembly constituency) is the legislative assembly constituency. BJP candidate Ajay Singh won the assembly election 2022 and now he is serving as MLA from Harraiya. Harraiya Times is a digital news portal for daily News updates.

References

Cities and towns in Basti district